Apache Fury ( meaning "man of the stage") is a 1964 Italian-Spanish Spaghetti Western directed and co-written by José María Elorrieta. It was based on a novel by Eduardo Guzman.

Plot
At an isolated coaching station in the Arizona desert, Steve Loman is approached by some outlaw friends.  They tell him that a stagecoach containing the corrupt Judge Driscoll, his bride to be Ruth, her young brother Jimmy and a card sharp are heading for the station with a large amount of money.  As the Apaches led by Geronimo are on the warpath, it would be too easy for Loman to revenge himself on Driscoll who sent Loman to prison on a false charge that also ruined his army career and split the money with the outlaws and travel to Mexico. Loman refuses.

As the stagecoach arrives it is attacked by an Apache war party and shelters inside the station.  Adding to their troubles, the young Jimmy mistakes approaching non-hostile Pima Indians for Apache killing one that sets the Pima against the whites unless they surrender Jimmy.

Cast
 Frank Latimore as Major Steve Loman
 Nuria Torray as Ruth
 Jesús Puente as Judge Todd Driscoll 
 Ángel Ortiz as Silas
 Germán Cobos as George Gordon
 Mariano Vidal Molina as Burt Kaplan
 Pastor Serrador as Richard 'Poker Dick'  
 Jorge Martín as Elmer Roscoe
 Guillermo Vera as Juan Diego 
 Julio Pérez Tabernero as Jimmy
 Aldo Sambrell as Burt henchman
 Alfonso de la Vega as Soldado
 Francisco Braña as Burt henchman
 Rufino Inglés as Banquero
 Guillermo Méndez as Capitán
 Antonio Cintado as Sargento
 José Sancho
 Yvonne Bastien

References

External links 
 

1964 Western (genre) films
1964 films
Spaghetti Western films
Italian Western (genre) films
Spanish Western (genre) films
Films directed by José María Elorrieta
1960s Spanish-language films
1960s Italian films